Las Varas is located in the state of Nayarit, Mexico, just a few miles southeast from Zacualpan and west Compostela. It is near the beaches of Chacala, Chacalilla, Lo De Marcos, Los Ayala, Rincón de Guayabitos, La Peñita de Jaltemba, Playa Tortugas, and San Francisco.

Populated places in Nayarit